Virt is a municipality at the Danube in the Komárno District in Slovakia in the Nitra Region.

History 
The village is known for findings of richly endowed Avar graves from the 7th and 8th century AD.In the 9th century, the territory of Vrbová nad Váhom became part of the Kingdom of Hungary. The first written mention of the village dates back to 1256. After the Austro-Hungarian army disintegrated in November 1918, Czechoslovak troops occupied the area, later acknowledged internationally by the Treaty of Trianon. Between 1938 and 1945 territory of Vrbová nad Váhom once more  became part of Miklós Horthy's Hungary through the First Vienna Award. From 1945 until the Velvet Divorce, it was part of Czechoslovakia. Since then it has been part of Slovakia.
Before 1990 it was part of Radvaň nad Dunajom.

Villages and municipalities in the Komárno District
Hungarian communities in Slovakia